The Sacred Heart Cathedral It is the mother of the Archdiocese of Lome (since September 14, 1955), one of the seven Catholic church districts of the African Republic of Togo. Built in just over a year (April 1901 to September 1902) by the German colonial authorities, then it became one of the iconic buildings of the new capital of Togo.

History
The first Catholic missionaries settled in Lomé in 1892. On September 21, 1902, in a solemn ceremony presided over by Bishop Albert, apostolic vicar of Côte-de-l'Or performed the consecration of the new sanctuary, which became one of symbols of urban landscape full expansion of the capital of Togo. On August 9, 1985, Pope John Paul II celebrated Mass in the cathedral.

See also
Roman Catholicism in Togo
Sacred Heart Cathedral (disambiguation)

References

Roman Catholic cathedrals in Togo
Buildings and structures in Lomé
Roman Catholic churches completed in 1902
20th-century Roman Catholic church buildings